Mayfield Canyon, a canyon northwest of the town of Bishop in Inyo County, California.

It was the site of the Battle of Mayfield Canyon in the Owens Valley Indian War. During the battle Colonel William Mayfield, leader of the Owens Valley settler militia was killed.  His name was given to the canyon.

California Historical Landmark
The site of the Battle of Mayfield Canyon is a California Historical Landmark number 211, assigned on June, 20, 1935.
The battle was part of the Owens Valley Indian War.

The California Historical Landmark reads:
NO. 211 MAYFIELD CANYON BATTLEGROUND - On April 8, 1862, a body of troopers and settlers entered Mayfield Canyon (named for one of the settlers) to fight the Indians supposed to be there. However, the Indians had evacuated the canyon so the group made camp at its mouth. The next day they went up the canyon again, but this time they were forced to retreat to Owens Valley.

See also
California Historical Landmarks in Inyo County
History of California through 1899

References

Landforms of Inyo County, California
Landforms of the Sierra Nevada (United States)
Canyons and gorges of California